Our Lady of Perpetual Succour Church or Our Lady's Church is a Roman Catholic parish church in Great Billing, Northamptonshire, England. It was built in 1878 and founded by the descendants of John Elwes at Billing Hall in the Romanesque Revival style. It is located on the High Street in Billing. Since 2006, it has been the Diocesan Shrine to Our Lady of Perpetual Succour.

History

Foundation
In 1795, Robert Cary Elwes, a family member of John Elwes,  bought Billing Hall. In 1866, his grandson, Valentine Cary Elwes inherited the hall. He was the father of Gervase Elwes and Dudley Cary-Elwes, who was later the Catholic Bishop of Northampton. In 1874, the family converted to Catholicism. Shortly afterwards, a chapel was built in Billing Hall.

Construction
In 1878, Our Lady of Perpetual Help was built. It replaced the chapel in the hall and was paid for by Valentine Cary Elwes. It was built in the Romanesque Revival style and has a handcrafted copy of the icon of Our Lady of Perpetual Help installed above the altar. In 1926, the aisles were added. In 1994, an aedicula was added to the Lady Chapel. It was built by Ormsby of Scarisbrick who also did work on Our Lady of Sorrows Church in Bognor Regis. On 8 September 2006, Peter Doyle the Bishop of Northampton made the church the Diocesan Shrine of Our Lady of Perpetual Succour.

Buried in the church cemetery are Valentine Cary Elwes, Gervase Elwes, Bishop Dudley Cary-Elwes and Gervase's son and parish priest of Our Lady's Church, Monsignor Valentine Elwes.

Parish
The parish of Our Lady of Perpetual Succour is in a partnership with the parish of Sacred Heart Church in Weston Favell. Our Lady's Church has one Sunday Mass at 9:15am. Sacred Heart Church has two Sunday Masses at 5:30pm on Saturday and at 10:30am.

References

External links
 

Churches in Northampton
Roman Catholic churches in Northamptonshire
Roman Catholic churches completed in 1878
Romanesque Revival church buildings in England
1878 establishments in England
19th-century Roman Catholic church buildings in the United Kingdom
Shrines to the Virgin Mary
Roman Catholic shrines in the United Kingdom